Walt Newland was an American football coach.  He was the head football coach at the College of Emporia for the 1946 season.  The school had ceased football competition at the conclusion of the 1942 season due to World War II.  Newland completed the season with a record of 1–8.

Head coaching record

References

Year of birth missing
Year of death missing
College of Emporia Fighting Presbies football coaches